Guidantonio Manfredi (also known as Guidaccio) (1407 – June 20, 1448) was lord of Faenza and Imola in the early 15th century. He was also a condottiero.

He was born in Faenza, the son of Gian Galeazzo I Manfredi, and inherited his lands in Romagna, ruling first in association with his brother, Carlo, and later alone. From 1439 he was also lord of Imola and Modigliana. He was married with Bianchina Trinci, daughter of Niccolò, lord of Foligno, until her assassination in 1441. The following year he remarried with Agnese, daughter of Guidantonio I da Montefeltro, lord of Urbino.

As a condottiero, he was captain of the Republic of Florence in 1430  and of Francesco I Sforza in 1433.

He died at Bagni di Petriolo. His was succeeded by his brother Astorre.

References
Page at www.condottieridiventura.it

1407 births
1448 deaths
15th-century condottieri
Guidantonio
Lords of Faenza